Ghoom-Jorebunglow Degree College is a self-financed degree college in Ghoom, Darjeeling. It offers undergraduate courses in arts. It is affiliated to the University of North Bengal.

Departments

Arts

Economics
Education
English
Geography
History
Nepali
Political Science
Sociology

See also

References

External links
Official website
University of North Bengal
University Grants Commission
National Assessment and Accreditation Council

Colleges affiliated to University of North Bengal
Universities and colleges in Darjeeling district
Educational institutions in India with year of establishment missing